Zhenzhou may refer to:

Zhenzhou, Sichuan, a town in Junlian County, Sichuan, China
Zhenzhou, Jiangsu, a town in Yizheng, Jiangsu, China

Historical prefectures
Zhen Prefecture (Jiangsu) (眞州), a prefecture between the 11th and 14th centuries in modern Jiangsu, China
Zhen Prefecture (Hebei) (鎮州), a prefecture between the 9th and 11th centuries in modern Hebei, China
Zhen Prefecture (Guizhou) (眞州), a prefecture between the 14th and 17th centuries in modern Guizhou, China
Zhen Prefecture (Zhejiang) (震州), a prefecture during 6th-century Liang dynasty in modern Zhejiang, China
Zhen Prefecture (Sichuan) (眞州), a prefecture during 8th-century Tang dynasty in modern Sichuan, China
Zhen Prefecture (Mongolia) (鎮州), a prefecture during 11th-century Liao dynasty in modern Bulgan Province, Mongolia
Zhen Prefecture (Hainan) (鎮州), a prefecture during 12th-century Song dynasty in modern Hainan, China
Zhen Prefecture (Beijing) (鎮州), a prefecture during 13th-century Jin dynasty in modern Beijing, China

See also
Zhen (disambiguation)
Zhengzhou, capital of Henan Province, China